MLB 10: The Show is a baseball simulation video game created by Sony Computer Entertainment's San Diego division. The MLB: The Show series of video games is the longest officially licensed baseball simulation game on the PlayStation. The game is made for Sony's own PlayStation 3, PlayStation 2, and PlayStation Portable. It is the direct successor to MLB 09: The Show, and was released on March 2, 2010.  The game presents a number of new features, including catcher mode, and Home Run Derby.

Cover athlete
Joe Mauer, the catcher for the Minnesota Twins, appears on the cover of MLB 10: The Show. Mauer was also the 2009 American League MVP.

Reception

The PlayStation 3 version received "universal acclaim", while the PSP version received "generally favorable reviews", according to the review aggregation website Metacritic.

The PlayStation 2 version of the game sold almost 200,000 copies.

Soundtrack

See also
 Major League Baseball 2K10

References

External links

2010 video games
Major League Baseball video games
North America-exclusive video games
PlayStation 2 games
PlayStation 3 games
PlayStation Portable games
Sony Interactive Entertainment games
Sports video games set in the United States
Sports video games with career mode
 10
Multiplayer and single-player video games
Video games developed in the United States
Video games set in Maryland
San Diego Studio games